Ron Toman (October 30, 1934 – June 2, 2011) was an American football player and coach. He was an assistant coach at Tulane, Texas and Notre Dame. He served as offensive coordinator for the Texas Longhorns from 1981 to 1985, succeeding Leon Manley.

References

1934 births
2011 deaths
Sportspeople from Kansas City, Missouri
American football quarterbacks
Tulane Green Wave football coaches
Texas Longhorns football coaches
Notre Dame Fighting Irish football coaches
Players of American football from Kansas City, Missouri